B K Parthasarathi is an Andhra Pradesh politician. He is the leader of the Telugu Desam Party and has won twice as an MLA from the Penukonda constituency.

Career 

Parthasarathi entered politics by becoming Zilla Parishad chairman of the Anantapur district in 1996. In 1999, TDP offered him the MP seat of Hindupur and he won with a majority of 134,636, defeating S. Gangadhar of the Congress Party.

In the 2004 Loksabha elections, he was defeated by G. Nizamuddin with a narrow margin of 1,840 votes.

In the 2009 election, he contested as an MLA candidate from Penukonda and won in a triangular fight by 14,385 votes, defeating K T Sreedhar of Congress Party.

In the 2014 elections, he again won by defeating Malagundla Sankaranarayana, of YSR Congress Party. In 2019, Malagundla Sankaranarayana defeated him by a wide margin.

He became a Tirumala Tirupati Devasthanams board member in April 2018. He became district Telugu Desam Party president in 2009.

References 

Living people
India MPs 1999–2004
People from Anantapur district
Andhra Pradesh MLAs 2009–2014
Andhra Pradesh MLAs 2014–2019
Telugu Desam Party politicians
People from Rayalaseema
1959 births